The judo tournament at the 2015 African Games in Brazzaville was held between September 13–15, 2015. There were 223 judoka from 36 nations participating.

Participating nations

Results

Women's 48 kg

Women's 52 kg

Women's 57 kg

Women's 63 kg

Women's 70 kg

Women's 78 kg

Women's +78 kg

Men's 60 kg

Men's 66 kg

Men's 73 kg

Men's 81 kg

Men's 90 kg

Men's 100 kg

Men's +100 kg

Medal table

References

External links
 

2015 African Games
All-Africa Games
2015